Robert Goute (19 December 1919 – 15 December 2014) was a drum major in the Air de Paris. 

Goute was the Head of the Music Commission of the Sports and Cultural Federation of France until 1979, founding member of it in 1980, and president of the Fédération internationale de l'école française du tambour in 1990. He is one of the leading figures in the revival of the modern drum band.

Life and career 
Robert Goute was born in Saint-Denis on December 19, 1919 to a family of drummers. His father was a masonry entrepreneur, volunteer firefighter, and amateur musician. He introduced Robert to drums from the age of five in the ranks of the local music society he directed, Les Bleuets de Domont. He quickly demonstrated exceptional skills, and in 1933 he was noticed by Gabriel Defrance, who was a drum major of the music of the Republican Guard.

Robert Goute married and was a father of four children (2 girls and 2 boys). He died on December 15, 2014 at the Isle-Adam hospital (Val-d'Oise).

French Air Force (1938–1970) 

Goute was admitted at the age of 18 to the drum competition of the French Air Force, and he joined the musical formation on February 28, 1938. Maurice Bonnard, the drum major, quickly entrusted him to the drum desk. In 1940, the band was forced to move to the free zone in Toulouse, where it was transformed in a men's choir to participate in the weekly radio concerts given by the Music de l'air. Back in Paris after the Liberation of France, Robert Goute lead his team of thirteen instrumentalists to a unique technical and musical level, and in 1953, he replaced Maurice Bonnard as drum major.

Recruitment was improved and, in 1956, there were 27 awards from the Conservatoire de Paris within the drum band. Like the Patrouille de France, with which it is often associated, its fanfare band contributed to the reputation of high virtuosity of the air force. In 1963, during the rehearsals of the ballet  Notre-Dame de Paris  by Maurice Jarre and Pierre Petit, he was called upon to help the percussion class of the Conservatoire because of difficulty ensuring the part. Robert Goute left active service on March 1, 1970, after more than 31 years of active service of the Air Force.

Sports and Cultural Federation of France (1949–1979) 
After the death of Gabriel Defrance in 1952 and a vacancy for three years, Goute accepted the chairmanship of the federal music commission of the Sports Federation de France (FSF) of which he had been a member since 1949. He directed movements towards more contemporary styles and regularly published technical and educational articles in Les Jeunes, introducing spatial evolutions in the presentation of drum bands. However, his efforts to structure regional and federal orchestras failed.

French Confederation of Drum Bands (1980–2014) 

In the year following his departure from the French Sports and Cultural Federation (1980), Robert Goute was one of the founding members of the French Confederation of Drum Bands (CFBF). In 1986, Edgar Faure, president of the organizing committee of the celebrations of the French Revolution wanted a parade of 2,000 drums on the Champs-Élysées on July 14, 1989. Robert Goute was asked by Jean-Paul Goude to help organize the band within his show. He composed the drum program and Wally Badarou organized the instrumental part.

At the end of the event, Jack Lang spoke about the creation of a French drum federation, an instrument associated with the French national identity. Because of this, the International Federation of the French School of the Drum (FIEFT) was created in 1990. Goute was its first president. He developed the French drum technique with more than 20 foreign nations and ensured his presence in major international musical events before resigning his position as president for that of honorary president.

Books 
In 1954, Robert Goute published four volumes of a work devoted to the tambour d'ordonnance  (orderly drum):
  ;
  ;
  ;
 .

In 1962, Goute published the Manuel du tambour-major (manual of the drum major), the first educational work of its kind. It was praised by many military musicians and was reissued in 1988:
  ;
  (réédition 1988).

This work is preceded and followed by many others including:
  ;
  ;
 .

and brief musical notes:
  ;
  ;
  ;
  ;
  ;

Its various methods and collections were later adopted in Switzerland, the Netherlands, Canada, and many American universities.

References 

Chevaliers of the Ordre des Arts et des Lettres
Knights of the Ordre national du Mérite
1919 births
2014 deaths